The autism rights movement, also known as the autistic acceptance movement, is a social movement within the context of disability rights that emphasizes a neurodiversity paradigm, viewing the autism spectrum as a result of natural variations in the human brain rather than as a disease to be cured. The movement advocates for several goals, including greater acceptance of autistic traits and behaviors; services that focus on improving quality of life and well-being instead of suppression and masking of autistic traits or imitations of the behaviors of neurotypical (non-autistic) peers (which have been associated with poorer mental well-being and mental health according to numerous recent studies); the creation of social networks and events that allow autistic people to socialize on their own terms; and the recognition of the autistic community as a minority group.

Autism rights advocates believe that the autism spectrum should be accepted as a natural expression of the human genome, and accommodated like any other condition (the social model of disability). This perspective is distinct from two other views: that autism is a genetic defect and should be addressed by targeting the autism gene(s), or is caused by environmental factors (including fringe theories such as the debunked and false narrative that autism is caused by vaccines).

There are a wide variety of both supportive and critical opinions about the movement among people who are autistic or associated with people with autism. A common criticism leveled against autistic activists is that the majority of them are "high-functioning" or have Asperger syndrome and do not represent the views of "low-functioning" autistic people.

History

1980s–1990s: Autistic-run organizations, newsletters, and conferences 
Jim Sinclair is credited as the first person to communicate the anti-cure or autism rights perspective in the late 1980s. In 1992, Sinclair co-founded the Autism Network International, an organization that publishes newsletters "written by and for autistic people." Other individuals involved in the creation of the ANI were Donna Williams and Kathy Grant, two autistic people who knew Sinclair through pen pal lists and autism conferences. The ANI newsletter, Our Voice, had its first issue distributed online in November 1992, to an audience of mostly neurotypical professionals and parents of young autistic children. The number of autistics in the organization slowly grew over the years, and ANI eventually became a communication network for like-minded autistics. Sinclair wrote the essay, "Don't Mourn for Us", published in 1993 in the ANI newsletter (Volume 1, Number 3), with an anti-cure perspective on autism. The essay has been thought of by some to be a touchstone for the fledgling autism-rights movement, and has been mentioned in The New York Times and New York Magazine.

In 1996, ANI established a yearly retreat known as "Autreat". Autreat was a retreat and conference held in the United States specifically for autistic people and was held every year from 1996 to 2013, except in 2001. The theme of the first conference in 1996 was "Celebrating Autistic Culture" and had close to 60 participants. It was hosted at Camp Bristol Hills in Canadaigua, New York. The success of Autreat later inspired similar autistic retreats, such as the Association for Autistic Community's conference, Autspace, in the United States; Autscape in the United Kingdom; and Projekt Empowerment in Sweden.

Also in 1996, Martijn Dekker, an autistic computer programmer from the Netherlands, launched an e-mail list called "Independent Living on the Autism Spectrum", or "InLv". The list also welcomed those with "cousin" conditions, such as ADHD, dyslexia, and dyscalculia. American writer Harvey Blume was a member of the list and described it as embracing what he called "neurological pluralism" in a 1997 article in The New York Times.
 Blume discussed the concept of neurological diversity with Australian sociologist Judy Singer. The term "neurodiversity" was first published in Singer's 1998 Honours thesis and in Blume's 1998 article in The Atlantic.

2000s–2010s: The rise of self-advocacy and autistic pride 
Aspies For Freedom (AFF) was founded in 2004, and established 18 June as Autistic Pride Day starting in 2005. AFF was also instrumental in initiating protests against the National Alliance for Autism Research, Cure Autism Now, and the Judge Rotenberg Center.

In 2004, Michelle Dawson challenged applied behavior analysis (ABA) on ethical grounds. She testified in Auton v. British Columbia against the required government funding of ABA. That same year The New York Times covered the autism rights perspective by publishing Amy Harmon's article, "How about not curing us? Some autistics are pleading."

In 2006, the Autism Acceptance Project was founded by Estée Klar, the mother of an autistic child, with help from an autistic advisory and board. The project affiliated with the Autistic Self Advocacy Network (ASAN) and other activist groups in North America and was one of the first to sign the petition against the New York Child Study Campaign. It is also recognized by ASAN in a letter to the United Nations of being one of the first autism organizations to promote autism acceptance. From 2005 to 2008, TAAProject organized arts-based events to show the public an active autism rights movement that burgeoned online. In addition, it sponsored the controversial Joy of Autism: Redefining Ability and Quality of Life events and lectures in Toronto, featuring dozens of autistic artists and speakers including Jim Sinclair, Michelle Dawson, Phil Schwartz, Morton Ann Gernsbacher, Larry Bissonnette and more.

In 2008, ASAN succeeded in halting two ad campaigns it stated were demeaning to autistics. The first ads were a series published by the NYU Child Study Center that appeared in the form of ransom notes. One read, "We have your son. We will make sure he will no longer be able to care for himself or interact socially as long as he lives. This is only the beginning", and was signed, "Autism". The second ads were published by PETA and featured a bowl of milk with the leftover bits of cereal forming a frowning face. The text read, "Got autism?" and was meant to advertise what PETA claims is a link between autism and the casein in milk. Phone calls, letters and petitions organized by ASAN led to the removal of these ads.

The rise of the Internet has provided more opportunities for autistic individuals to connect and organize. Considering the geographical distance, communication and speech patterns of autistic individuals, and the domination of neurotypical professionals and family members in established autism organizations, the Internet has provided an invaluable space for members of the movement to organize and communicate.

2020 onwards 
The start of the decade was quickly dominated by the COVID-19 pandemic, causing a drop-off in the number of physical events in the summer of 2020, including Autism Pride events. Much of autism awareness and campaigning was driven by social media, including the notable growth of TikTok and the emergence of autistic advocates like Chloe Hayden and Paige Layle.

At the same time, autism advocacy made progress within the traditional media with the autistic perspective making its way into influential business publications such as Harvard Business Review and Fast Company. A comprehensive approach to inclusion in the workplace, the Canary Code, was developed with a specific focus on autistic talent as well as other marginalized communities.

Advocacy controversy
The neurodiversity paradigm falls in contrast with the medical model of autism, which considers autism a pathology. Those who favour the pathology paradigm, which aligns with the medical model of disability, see autism as a disorder to be treated or cured. Proponents of the pathology paradigm argue that atypical behaviors of autistic individuals are detrimental and should therefore be reduced or eliminated through behavior modification. Their efforts focus primarily on medical research to identify genetic and environmental risk factors in autism. Those who favour the neurodiversity paradigm, which aligns with the social model of disability, see autism as a naturally-occurring variation in the brain. Neurodiversity advocates argue that efforts to eliminate autism should not be compared, for example, to curing cancer, but instead to the antiquated notion of curing left-handedness. Their advocacy efforts focus primarily on acceptance, accommodation, and support for autistic people as "neuro-minorities" in society. Proponents of neurodiversity often argue that it is harmful to autistic people to pathologize their behavior.

Pathology paradigm
The pathology paradigm is the traditional view of autism through a biomedical lens, in which it is seen as a disorder characterized by various impairments, mainly in communication and social interaction. Those taking this perspective believe that autism is generally a kind of harmful dysfunction. Ways of functioning which diverge from a typical brain are "incorrect" or "unhealthy" and must therefore be treated or cured. The atypical behaviors of autistic individuals are considered a detriment to social and professional success and should therefore be reduced or eliminated through behavior modification therapy such as applied behavioural therapy. Proponents of this view include very few autistic adults as this is more often the view of parents when compared to autistic adults adopting the neurodiversity paradigm. These advocates believe that medical research is necessary to address the "autism epidemic", reduce suffering, and provide the best outcomes for autistic individuals. In addition to etiological research, other areas of focus may include biology, diagnosis, and treatment, including medication, behavioural and psychological interventions, and the treatment of co-existing medical conditions.

Advocacy groups in the US that focus primarily on medical research include Autism Speaks who the Autistic community consider to be a hate group, the Autism Science Foundation, and its predecessor organizations, the Autism Coalition for Research and Education, the National Alliance for Autism Research, and Cure Autism Now, and the former Autism Research Institute.

Neurodiversity paradigm and autistic self-advocacy movement

The neurodiversity paradigm is the understanding that humanity has a variety of neurotypes, and always has. The autistic self-advocacy group Autistics for Autistics describes it this way: "Neurodiversity means that –like biodiversity– all of us have a role to play in society ...and we should be valued for who we are. Included in public life, such as school and employment. For nonverbal autistics, this also means equal and fair access to communication, such as AAC." The neurodiversity movement views autism as a different way of being rather than as a disease or disorder that must be cured, and embraces the social model of disability which focuses on removing access barriers in society so that disabled people can be included, rather than on "fixing" disabled people. In this way, it is aligned with the principles of the broader disability rights movement.

The autistic self-advocacy movement, made up of autistic individuals, works from a social model of disability perspective. For example, the Autistic Self Advocacy Network describes its mandate as to "advance the principles of the disability rights movement with regard to autism". The social model of disability is especially important to many autistic people who have been raised to think they are "broken versions of normal" rather than being accepted and having accommodations made for their disabilities. A shift from the medical model to the social model of disability has real-world advantages: for instance, some software companies now adjusting their job interview processes to be more accessible to autistic applicants rather than applying pressure on the applicants to "act neurotypical". This has strengthened the industry's pool of applicants while also reducing unemployment for autistic people.

Autistic people are considered to have neurocognitive differences which give them distinct strengths and weaknesses, and are capable of succeeding when appropriately accommodated and supported. This is not to belittle the challenges that autistic people face, but rather to point out that many of these challenges are due to structural inequities that can be remedied through equal access and acceptance of autistic differences. In the workplace, creating systems that support autistic employment and success through mechanisms such as organizational transparency, justice, and flexibility, benefits all employees

There is no leader of the neurodiversity movement and little academic research has been conducted on it as a social phenomenon. As such, proponents of the neurodiversity paradigm have heterogenous beliefs, but are consistent in the view that autism cannot be separated from an autistic person. Advocacy efforts may include: opposition to therapies that aim to make children "indistinguishable from their peers", advocacy of accommodations in schools and work environments, and lobbying for the inclusion of autistic people when making decisions that affect them.

Neurodiversity advocates are opposed to research for a cure, as this aim is a form of eugenics, and instead support research that helps autistic people thrive as they are. Only a small percentage of research funding goes towards the quality of life needs of autistic adults.

Recent research found evidence that autistic self-advocates are disadvantaged in many disability / autism rights organisations, they are rarely involved in leadership or decision-making within organisations. Studies also show that poverty, unpaid positions at disability organisations and lack of support are major barriers for most autistic people, including autistic people with an intellectual disability who wish to do self-advocacy.

Advocacy groups that focus primarily on acceptance and accommodation include Autism Network International, Autism National Committee, Autistic Self Advocacy Network, and Autistic Women & Nonbinary Network.

Perspectives

Autism rights perspectives

Autism is classified by psychologists as a disorder. However, some fundraising organizations have referred to caring for autistic individuals as being comparable to treating a patient with cancer, though extended over the duration of a normal lifespan. Autistic children have also been described as being held hostage to a psychiatric disorder. Boyd Haley, an anti-vaccine activist and early promoter of the debunked claim that thimerosol causes autism, labeled autism as "mad child disease" (akin to mad cow disease), which some autistic individuals and their parents have found highly offensive. Margaret Somerville, founding director of the McGill Centre for Medicine, Ethics and Law, said that with activism there is a direct goal and it is sometimes necessary to sacrifice complexity and nuance to make a point, but some autistic activists do not believe desperation justifies the rhetoric. Bennett L. Leventhal said he understands concern about comparing autistic children to hostages and notes it is a misnomer to call autism a "disease" that will consume children if untreated. Autistic self-advocates also reject terming the reported increase in autism diagnoses as an 'epidemic' since the word implies autism is a disease and point out that the increase is due to an expansion of diagnostic criteria itself, rather than an epidemic.

Attempts have been made to place a figure on the financial cost of autism, addressed to both scholarly and popular audiences. These efforts have been criticized by some autism rights advocates, who compare them to similar calculations about "persons with bad heredity" made by the eugenics movement in the early 20th century. Michelle Dawson has pointed out that no effort has been made to examine the cost of 'eliminating the disease' to autistic individuals, and she, as well as others, have also pointed out the valuable contributions autistic individuals can, and have made to society. Dr. Temple Grandin has speculated that an autistic caveman probably invented the first stone spear, and that if autism were eliminated, society would lose most of its scientists, musicians, and mathematicians.

Autism as a spectrum
Some argue that while some autistic people can function "normally", that any impairments not due to prejudice are insignificant or nonexistent and deserve to have their condition viewed as a difference (akin to being left-handed), other autistic people are severely impaired and should be counted as having disabilities (akin to having a broken leg).

However, many autistic activists refute this perspective, saying that it is not easy to distinguish between "high" and "low" functioning and that these labels do more harm than good. The majority of autistic individuals oppose the distinction between the low and high functioning labels as well as the medically abandoned distinction between autism and Asperger syndrome, and believe that functioning labels are not important in helping individuals get proper consultation and treatment.

Autism does not need to be cured

"Curing" autism is a controversial and politicized issue. Doctors and scientists are not sure of the causes of autism yet many organizations like Autism Research Institute and Autism Speaks have advocated researching a cure. Members of the various autistic rights organizations view autism as a way of life rather than as a disease and thus advocate acceptance over a search for a cure. Michelle Dawson wrote that common therapies for the behavioral and language differences associated with autism, like applied behavior analysis, are not only misguided but also unethical.

The "anti-cure perspective" endorsed by the movement is a view that autism is not a disorder, but a normal occurrence—an alternate variation in brain wiring or a less common expression of the human genome. Advocates of this perspective believe that autism is a unique way of being that should be validated, supported and appreciated rather than shunned, discriminated against or eliminated. Sometimes called a "strengths-based" diagnosis, it means that each individual's challenges and strengths should be equally recognized and the quirks and uniqueness of autistic individuals should be viewed inclusively, as with the differences of any minority group, and that efforts to eliminate autism should not be compared, for example, to curing cancer but instead to the antiquated notion of curing left-handedness. The ARM is a part of the larger disability rights movement, and as such acknowledges the social model of disability. Within the model, struggles faced by autistic people are viewed as discrimination rather than deficiencies.

Jim Sinclair, a leader in the movement, argues that autism is essential to a person, not a disease secondary to the person. Sinclair says that wishing that an autistic person be cured is equivalent to wishing that they disappear and another completely different person exist in their place. Visions for a future where autism has been eradicated, Sinclair believes, is the desire to end the autistic culture.

Most autistic self-advocates agree that autistic people should not be made to act exactly like everyone else, but that society should accommodate their disability and that autism services should focus on quality of life, rather than conformity. Simon Baron-Cohen, a professor of developmental psychology at Trinity College, Cambridge, and an autism researcher, expressed the latter view. Baron-Cohen said:

Autistic people have their own culture

Some autistic activists suggest that life with autism is very much like being born among people who speak a different language, have a religion or philosophy one does not share and live a lifestyle that feels alien. To put it differently, autistic people have an individual culture that's often very different from their environment. Social media, meetups and even specific professions are all spaces where autistic people connect and may share common language or a common culture.

This perspective is often voiced in opposition to the pathologisation of autistic modes of thought and social "rulebooks", as there are many people without autism who either claim that autistic people all think the same (on account of their similarities with each other and distinctions from members of the general public) or are completely different from each other and share no more than a label (on account of their individual life experiences, differences, and differences across the spectrum) or the suggestion that the existence of similar talents within autistic people are merely compensatory factors for a group of people who (according to non-autistic people) express severe disability or lack originality.

Autistic people require inclusion in the autism debate
A common theme expressed among autism rights activists and neurodiversity groups is that they are different from parent- and professional-led organizations and conferences that dominate the autism scene. Michelle Dawson criticizes the norm of allowing parents to speak on behalf of their autistic children at conferences to the exclusion of autistics. "With the happy and proud collaboration of governments, courts, researchers, service providers, and funding bodies," she says, "parents have succeeded in removing autistics from the vicinity of any important discussions or decisions." This exclusion results in policy and treatment decisions being made solely by individuals who do not directly experience autism.

Jim Sinclair states that autism conferences are traditionally geared toward neurotypical parents and professionals, and that to an autistic person they may be quite "hostile" in terms of sensory stimulation and rigidity.

In defiance of the common complaint that anti-cure advocates' ability to articulate complex opinions in writing—which some critics see as being impossible for autistic people—autistic adults such as Amanda Baggs use their own writing and videos to demonstrate that it is possible for severely disabled autistics to be autism rights advocates. She says that when the critics assume that intelligent and articulate autistic people do not have difficulties like self-injurious behavior and difficulty with self-care, they affect the opinions of policy makers and make it more difficult for intelligent and articulate autistic people to get services. Baggs cites an example of an autistic person who was denied services when it was discovered that she could type.

Autism therapy is often unethical

Aspies For Freedom (AFF) stated that the most common therapies for autism are unethical, since they focus on extinguishing harmless stimming, forcing eye contact and breaking routines. AFF argued that ABA therapy and restriction of stimming "and other autistic coping mechanisms" are mentally harmful, that aversion therapy and the use of restraints are physically harmful, and that alternative treatments like chelation therapy are dangerous. The United Nations (UN) has also called out many autism treatments as "ill-treatment or torture".

Michelle Dawson, a Canadian autism self-advocate, testified in court against government funding of ABA therapy. An autistic person named Jane Meyerding criticized therapy which attempts to remove autistic behaviors because she says that the behaviors that the therapy tries to remove are attempts to communicate. Autistics for Autistics (A4A), a Canadian group, has outlined some of the main objections to ABA from autistic self-advocates.

Autism genes should not be eliminated
Autism rights activists are opposed to attempts to eliminate autism genes, and argue that doing so would decrease human genetic diversity. In particular, there is opposition to prenatal genetic testing of autism in fetuses, which some believe might be possible in the future. On 23 February 2005, Joseph Buxbaum of the Autism Genome Project at the Icahn School of Medicine at Mount Sinai said there could be a prenatal test for autism within 10 years. However, the genetics of autism have proven to be extremely complex. A wider debate on the ethics involved in the possible elimination of a genotype that has advantages as well as disadvantages, has focused on possible negative effects of tampering with natural selection.

Some people lament that professionals, such as social workers, may discourage autistic people from having children. Activists are concerned that the "ultimate cure will be a genetic test to prevent autistic children from being born" and that most fetuses with so-called "autism genes" would be aborted if prenatal tests for autism are developed.

Opposition perspectives

Critics of the movement argue that anyone on the autism spectrum who is able to express their desire not to be cured must be in a position where they benefit from being autistic or being openly known as autistic, a viewpoint characterized by the fact that many autism advocates wind up gaining a minor celebrity status that puts them in a higher social position than their peers, and the fact that well-known autistic public figures tend to be verbal; this can imply to some that they are more likely to be independently successful than autistic people with higher support needs. Some controversy has also been raised on the prevalence of neurodiversity advocates who often identify from self-diagnosis and how it risks neurotypicals identifying themselves as autistic and misrepresent, or minimize the actual struggles and issues faced by people who actually have autism as well as the potential overdiagnosis in people with lower supports needs who are diagnosed.

Some feel that the neurodiversity movement is based on wishful thinking designed to gloss over the more serious problems associated with the disabling aspects of autism (such as self-harm, high support needs, rejection, and difficulties around issues of consent). Jonathan Mitchell, an autistic author and blogger who advocates for a cure for autism, has described neurodiversity as a "tempting escape valve" for autistics with low self-esteem.

Autism Speaks boycott

Autism Speaks has faced criticism from autism rights advocates for failing to represent autistic people and for exploitative practices. Until he resigned in 2013, John Elder Robison was Autism Speaks' only board member openly recognized as being on the autism spectrum. His resignation came two days after the release of an op-ed by the group's co-founder Suzanne Wright which, according to Robison, "is simply not defensible for someone who feels as I do, and I cannot continue to stand up for the public actions of an organization that makes the same mistakes over and over again by failing to connect to the community it purports to represent." Simone Greggs, the mother of an autistic child, filed a lawsuit against Autism Speaks for disability discrimination after her job offer was rescinded. The suit alleges that she lost the job offer due to asking for an accommodation on behalf of her autistic son.

Autism Speaks has produced three major films, each met with strong opposition from autism rights advocates. Autism Every Day is a documentary featuring interviews of parents with mostly negative opinions about autism and their situations. It has been criticized due to parents speaking about their children as if they are not there. In one interview, former board member Alison Singer, who has an autistic daughter, reveals she contemplated murder-suicide while her daughter is in the same room. I Am Autism is a short video that personifies autism as a narrative voice, which compares itself to several life-threatening diseases and makes the false claim of causing divorce. Sounding the Alarm is a documentary exploring the transition to adulthood and the cost of lifetime care. It was criticized for being "full of dehumanizing rhetoric" and portraying ignorance of nonverbal communication.

Because of the number of objections to the organization, Autism Speaks fundraising events have been the object of organized protest. Many of these protests are organized by the Autistic Self Advocacy Network. In 2013, the organization Boycott Autism Speaks published a list of companies that donate money to Autism Speaks along with their contact information, urging those in the Autistic community to pressure those companies into dropping their support via an active boycott, since direct appeals to Autism Speaks did not result in the desired changes. A month later, ASAN published its 2014 Joint Letter to the Sponsors of Autism Speaks, signed by 26 different disability-related organizations, appealing to the moral responsibility of the sponsors, donors, and other supporters.

Autism rights groups
There are several organizations in the autism rights movement. Some like the Autistic Self Advocacy Network are led exclusively by Autistic people, while others such as Autism National Committee encourage cooperation between Autistic people and their non-autistic allies.

Events and activities
In 2010, Autistics Speaking Day was a response to the then-upcoming first commemoration of Communication Shutdown. The annual Communication Shutdown event encourages non-autistics to refrain from using social networking websites for one day as a perspective-taking exercise, while Autistics Speaking Day encourages autistic people to become more active on social media and to describe their experiences during a time when there are fewer neurotypical voices in the mix.
In 2012, autistic activist Zoe Gross organized the first Disability Day of Mourning vigil held in memory of people with disabilities murdered by family members or caregivers. These vigils are now held annually on 1 March globally, often by local self-advocacy and disability rights groups.
In 2015, autistic activist Alanna Rose Whitney created the social media campaign #WalkInRed, later rebranded #RedInstead to be more inclusive of people with physical disabilities, as another alternative to Light It Up Blue.
Autism rights activists organize protests against organizations they consider objectionable, most notably Autism Speaks and the Judge Rotenberg Center. In the United States, activists affiliated with the Autistic Self Advocacy Network have organized numerous protests against Autism Speaks events, typically protesting and leafleting at fundraising walks. Autistic activists including Shain Neumeier and Lydia Brown have organized lobbying days and protests aiming to close or more strictly regulate the Judge Rotenberg Center.

Terminology
Although some prefer to use the person-first terminology person with autism, most members of the autistic community prefer autistic person or autistic in formal English, to stress that autism is a part of their identity rather than a disease they have. In addition, phrases like  are objectionable to many people, and are discouraged by prominent style guides.

The autistic community has developed abbreviations for commonly used terms, such as:
 Aspie – a person with Asperger syndrome. Not as frequently used with Aspergers being removed as an official diagnosis.
 Autie – an autistic person.
 Autistics and Cousins (AC) – a cover term including aspies, auties, and their "cousins", i.e. people with some autistic traits but no formal diagnosis.
 Curebie – a person with the desire to cure autism. This term is highly derogatory.
 Neurodiversity – appreciation of people regardless of neurological makeup. Neurodiversity is a natural variation within humanity, akin to biodiversity.
 Neurotypical (NT) – a person who does not have any neurological differences. Often used to describe an individual who is not on the autism spectrum.
 Allistic – a person who is not autistic but may or may not be neurodivergent in other ways, for example, a dyslexic person, or someone with ADHD. Originally and commonly, however, it is used satirically to describe those without autism.
 STISM – "the act of autistic people embracing who they are with confidence". Coined by musical group 8 Chicken Nuggets.

Autism spectrum disorders; DSM-V; Diagnostic criteria-Diagnostic and Statistical Manual of Mental Disorders, Fifth Edition (DSM-5) is the 2013 update to the American Psychiatric Association's (APA) classification and diagnostic tool. In the United States, the DSM serves as a universal authority for psychiatric diagnosis.

Autistic adults 
According to the medical perspective on autism, communication and social problems often cause difficulties in many areas of an autistic adult's life. A 2008 study found that adults with ASD commonly experience difficulty starting social interactions, longing for greater intimacy, a profound sense of isolation, and effort to develop greater social or self-awareness. However, from the perspective of the social model of disability, these struggles can be attributed to the lack of understanding, exclusion, and at times hostility from the predominately neurotypical society.

A much smaller proportion of autistic adults marry than the general population. It has been hypothesized that autistic people are subject to assortative mating; they tend to pair with each other and raise autistic offspring. This hypothesis has been publicized in the popular press, but has not been empirically tested.

British psychologist Simon Baron-Cohen said that an increasingly technological society has opened up niches for people with Asperger syndrome, who may choose fields that are "highly systematized and predictable". People with AS could do well in workplace roles that are "system-centered, and connect with the nitty-gritty detail of the product or the system."

Gender aspects

Women on the autism spectrum 
Autism is thought of as a condition mostly affecting males, with males up to four times more likely than females to be diagnosed as autistic or Asperger syndrome. Autistic females are "research orphans" according to Yale's Ami Klin; some drugs used to treat anxiety or hyperactivity that may accompany autism are rarely tested on autistic females. Autism may express differently in the sexes. Females may be more concerned with how they are viewed by peers and the failure to connect with people outside of their immediate family could lead to severe anxiety or clinical depression. Autistic girls who have normal intelligence may be more socially disadvantaged than males because of the "rising level of social interaction that comes in middle school," when girls' "friendships often hinge on attention to feelings and lots of rapid and nuanced communication." Additionally, autistic girls may be negatively impacted by being placed in specialized educational programs, where they will be surrounded by males and further isolated from female social contacts. Although sample sizes are too small to draw firm conclusions, one study suggests that women with autism are less likely than males over the long term to marry, have families, go to college, have careers and live independently. Females may also be different from males in terms of interests; autistic females rarely have interests in numbers or have stores of specialized knowledge. The profile of autism may change as more is understood about females, whose autism may go undiagnosed.

Transgender identities 

In recent years, some people have suggested links between autism and transgender people. This issue has not been without controversy, as the issue is open to confusion; it is currently unclear whether this correlation exists due to an innate characteristic of autism that may also cause unusual discrepancies in sex or gender, or whether it is merely the result of exposing a group of people who are disinclined to abide by arbitrary social norms, including those related to gender, to sexism and gender stereotypes.

Social impact 
Autism Spectrum Disorder may lead to problems in social interaction with peers. These problems can be severe or mild depending on the individual. Autistic people are often the target of bullying due to their idiosyncratic behavior, precise language, unusual interests, and impaired ability to perceive and respond in socially expected ways to nonverbal cues, particularly in interpersonal conflict, which results in them being sought out by classmates and rejected. Autisic people may be overly literal and may have difficulty interpreting and responding to sarcasm, banter, or metaphorical speech. Difficulties with social interaction may also manifest in a lack of play with other children.

The above problems can even arise in the family; given an unfavorable family environment, the child may be subject to emotional abuse. An autistic child, teen, or adult is often puzzled by this mistreatment, unaware of what has been done incorrectly. Unlike with other pervasive development disorders, most autistic persons want to be social, but fail to socialize successfully, which can lead to later withdrawal and asocial behavior, especially in adolescence. At this stage of life especially, they risk being drawn into unsuitable and inappropriate friendships and social groups. Autistic people often interact better with those considerably older or younger than themselves, rather than those within their own age group.

Autistic children often display advanced abilities for their age in language, reading, mathematics, spatial skills, or music—sometimes into the "gifted" range—but this may be counterbalanced by considerable delays in other developmental areas, like verbal and nonverbal communication or some lack of motor coordination. This combination of traits can lead to problems with teachers and other authority figures. An autistic child might be regarded by teachers as a "problem child" or a "poor performer". The child's extremely low tolerance for what they perceive to be ordinary and mundane tasks, such as typical homework assignments, can easily become frustrating; a teacher may well consider the child arrogant, spiteful, and insubordinate. Lack of support and understanding, in combination with the child's anxieties, can result in problematic behavior (such as severe tantrums, violent and angry outbursts, and withdrawal).

Autistic people continue to face barriers to obtaining and maintaining employment, with as many as 85% of college educated autistic adults among the ranks of the unemployed and many more struggling with underemployment and job instability. Outdated assumptions that the way neurotypicals think, communicate, and behave is the only "normal" or "correct" way excludes many skilled and capable autistic people who would otherwise excel in their careers. The more recent, research-backed view is that autistic people are merely speaking different, but equally valid, social languages. Increased workplace awareness and acceptance of this view of autistic people, as well as appropriate supports as necessary, is necessary to create healthier, more inclusive work environments with more equitable opportunities for career advancement and employee engagement and to reduce rates of unemployment, workplace discrimination, and employee disengagement and burnout.   

Homelessness is very common among autistic people as a result of the many structural barriers to their full inclusion in society.

Difficulties in relationships 
Two traits sometimes found in autistic individuals are mind-blindness (the inability to predict the beliefs and intentions of others) and alexithymia (the inability to identify and interpret emotional signals in oneself or others), which reduce the ability to be empathetically attuned to others. Alexithymia in ASD functions as an independent variable relying on different neural networks than those implicated in theory of mind. In fact, lack of theory of mind in ASD may be a result of a lack of information available to the mind due to the operation of the alexithymic deficit.

A second issue related to alexithymia involves the inability to identify and modulate strong emotions such as sadness or anger, which leaves the individual prone to "sudden affective outbursts such as crying or rage". According to Tony Attwood, the inability to express feelings using words may also predispose the individual to use physical acts to articulate the mood and release the emotional energy.

Autistic people report a feeling of being detached against their will from the world around them ("on the outside looking in"). They may have difficulty finding a life partner or getting married due to poor social skills. The complexity and inconsistency of the social world can pose an extreme challenge for autistic individuals. In the UK Autism Spectrum Disorder is covered by the Disability Discrimination Act; those with ASD who get treated badly because of it may have some redress. The first case was Hewett v Motorola 2004 (sometimes referred to as Hewitt) and the second was Isles v Ealing Council. The same applies in the United States with the Americans with Disabilities Act, amended in 2008 to include autism spectrum disorders.

According to Elizabeth Fein, the dynamic of role-playing games is especially positive and attractive to people on the autism spectrum. The social information exchanged in these games are explicit, top-down and systematic and they follow a set of shared abstract rules. Baez and Rattazzi showed that interpreting the implicit social information of daily life is difficult for them.

Autistic pride 

Autistic pride refers to pride in autism and shifting views of autism from "disease" to "difference". Autistic pride emphasizes the innate potential in all human phenotypic expressions and celebrates the diversity various neurological types express.

Autistic pride asserts that autistic people are not impaired or damaged; rather, they have a unique set of characteristics that provide them many rewards and challenges, not unlike their non-autistic peers.

Curing autism is a controversial and politicized issue. The "autistic community" can be divided into several groups. Some seek a cure for autism—sometimes dubbed as pro-cure—while others consider a cure unnecessary or unethical, or feel that autism conditions are not harmful or detrimental. For example, it may be seen as an evolutionary adaptation to an ecological niche by some environmentalists and the more radical autism rights campaigners.

Autistic culture and community 

With the recent increases in autism recognition and new approaches to educating and socializing autistics, an autistic culture has begun to develop. Autistic culture is based on a belief that autism is a unique way of being and not a disorder to be cured. The Aspie world, as it is sometimes called, contains people with Asperger syndrome (AS) and high functioning autism (HFA), and can be linked to three historical trends: the emergence of AS and HFA as labels, the emergence of the disability rights movement, and the rise of the Internet. Autistic communities exist both online and offline; many people use these for support and communication with others like themselves, as the social limitations of autism sometimes make it difficult to make friends, to establish support within general society, and to construct an identity within society.

Because many autistics find it easier to communicate online than in person, a large number of online resources are available. Some autistic individuals learn sign language, participate in online chat rooms, discussion boards, and websites, or use communication devices at autism-community social events. The Internet helps bypass non-verbal cues and emotional sharing that autistics tend to have difficulty with. It gives autistic individuals a way to communicate and form online communities.

Conducting work, conversation and interviews online in chat rooms, rather than via phone calls or personal contact, helps level the playing field for many autistics. A New York Times article said "the impact of the Internet on autistics may one day be compared in magnitude to the spread of sign language among the deaf" because it opens new opportunities for communication by filtering out "sensory overload that impedes communication among autistics."

Globally 

Autistic people may be perceived differently from country to country. For example, many Africans have spiritual beliefs about psychiatric disorders, which extends into perceived causes of autism. In one survey of Nigerian pediatric or psychiatric nurses, 40% cited preternatural causes of autism such as ancestral spirits or the action of the devil.

Notable Events

World Autism Day

World Autism Awareness Day, sometimes referred to as World Autism Day, is marked yearly on 2 April. It was designated by the United Nations General Assembly at the end of 2007. On 2 April 2009, activists left 150 strollers near Central Park in New York City to raise awareness that one in 150 children is estimated to be autistic.
Nowadays, there are many celebrations and activities all over the world on 2 April for World Autism Awareness Day. Autistic people have campaigned to rename it Autism Acceptance Day because of a misconception that the day is affiliated with Autism Speaks.

Autism Sunday

Autism Sunday is a global Christian event, observed on the second Sunday of February. It is supported by church leaders and organisations around the world. The event started as a small idea in the front room of British autism campaigners, Ivan and Charika Corea. It is now a huge event celebrated in many countries. Autism Sunday was launched in London in 2002 with a historic service at St. Paul's Cathedral.

Autism Awareness Year
The year 2002 was declared Autism Awareness Year in the United Kingdom—this idea was initiated by Ivan and Charika Corea, parents of an autistic child, Charin. Autism Awareness Year was led by the British Institute of Brain Injured Children, Disabilities Trust, The Shirley Foundation, National Autistic Society, Autism London and 800 organizations in the United Kingdom. It had the personal backing of British Prime Minister Tony Blair. This was the first ever occasion of partnership working on autism on such a huge scale. 2002 Autism Awareness Year helped raise awareness of the serious issues concerning autism and Asperger's Syndrome across the United Kingdom. A major conference, Autism 2002 was held at the King's Fund in London with debates in the House of Commons and the House of Lords in Westminster. Autism awareness ribbons were worn to mark the year.

British autism advocates want autistic people acknowledged as a minority rather than as disabled, because they say that "disability discrimination laws don't protect those who are not disabled but who 'still have something that makes them look or act differently from other people.'" But the autism community is split over this issue, and some view this notion as radical.

Autistic Pride Day 

Autistic Pride Day is an Aspies For Freedom initiative celebrated on 18 June each year. It is a day for celebrating the neurodiversity of people with autism. Inspired by LGBT+ communities, Autistic Pride often compares their efforts to the civil rights and LGBT social movements.

Autistics Speaking Day 
Autistics Speaking Day is a yearly event designated on 1 November, a self-advocacy campaign run by people with autism to raise awareness and challenge negative stereotypes about autism by speaking for themselves and sharing their stories. The first Autistics Speaking Day was held in 2010. According to Corina Becker, one of the early founders, the day is to "acknowledge our difficulties while sharing our strengths, passions, and interests." The idea for the event developed out of opposition to a Communication Shutdown fundraising campaign led by United States charity Autism Speaks. Participants had been asked to "simulate having autism" by straying from all forms of online communication for one day. The event received criticism and accused Autism Speaks of missing the point of what autism actually is, referring to autistic individuals comfort using other means of communication.

Autism Acceptance Project 

In 2006 the Autism Acceptance Project (TAAProject) was founded by Estée Klar, the mother of an autistic child, with help from an autistic advisory board. The project was dedicated to promoting acceptance and accommodations for autistic people in society and was primarily supported by autistic people. The website for TAAProject disappeared a decade later, but the idea of promoting acceptance has now been adopted with other campaigns such as Autism Acceptance Month.

Autism Acceptance Day 

In 2011, the first Autism Acceptance Day celebrations were organized by Paula Durbin Westby, as a response to traditional "Autism Awareness" campaigns which the Autistic community found harmful and insufficient. Autism Acceptance Day is now held every April. "Awareness" focuses on informing others of the existence of autism while "acceptance" pushes towards validating and honoring the autism community. By providing tools and educational material, people are encouraged to embrace the challenges autistic people face and celebrate their strengths. Rather than making autism into a crippling disability, acceptance integrates those on the autistic spectrum into everyday society. Instead of encouraging people to wear blue as Autism Awareness Day does, Autism Acceptance Day encourages people to wear red.

Autreat 

At Autreat—an annual autistic gathering—participants compared their movement to gay rights activists, or the Deaf culture, where sign language is preferred over surgery that might restore hearing. Other local organizations have also arisen: for example, a European counterpart, Autscape, was created around 2005.

Scholarship

Autism spectrum disorders received increasing attention from social-science scholars in the early 2000s, with the goals of improving support services and therapies, arguing that autism should be tolerated as a difference not a disorder, and by how autism affects the definition of personhood and identity. Sociological research has also investigated how social institutions, particularly families, cope with the challenges associated with autism.

A study published on 20 January 2021, by the University of Texas at Dallas suggests that educating non-autistic people about the strengths and challenges of autistic people can help reduce stigma and misconceptions surrounding autism, which may help increase social inclusion of autistic people. The study also found that implicit biases about autism were harder to overcome for non-autistic people.

Media portrayals 

Much of the public perception of autism is based on its portrayals in biographies, movies, novels, and TV series. Many of these portrayals have been inaccurate, and have contributed to a divergence between public perception and the clinical reality of autism. For example, in the 2005 movie Mozart and the Whale, the opening scene gives four clues that a leading character has Asperger syndrome, and two of these clues are extraordinary savant skills. The savant skills are not needed in the film, but in movies savant skills have become a stereotype for the autism spectrum, because of the incorrect assumption that most autistic people are savants.

Some works from the 1970s have autistic characters, who are rarely labeled. In contrast, in the 2013 BBC2 television miniseries The Politician's Husband, the impact of Noah Hoynes' Asperger syndrome on the boy's behavior and on his family, and steps Noah's loved ones take to accommodate and address it, are prominent plot points in all three episodes.

Popular media have depicted special talents of some children with autism, including exceptional abilities as seen in the 1988 movie Rain Man.

Since the 1970s, fictional portrayals of people with autism, Asperger syndrome, and other ASCs have become more frequent. Public perception of autism is often based on these fictional portrayals in novels, biographies, movies, and TV series. These depictions of autism in media today are often made in a way that brings pity to the public and their concern of the topic, because their viewpoint is never actually shown, leaving the public without knowledge of autism and its diagnosis. Portrayals in the media of characters with atypical abilities (for example, the ability to multiply large numbers without a calculator) may be misinterpreted by viewers as accurate portrayals of all autistic people and of autism itself. Additionally, the media frequently depicts autism as only affecting children, which promotes the misconception that autism does not affect adults.

Notable individuals

Some notable figures such as Temple Grandin, a food animal handling systems designer and author, and Tim Page, a Pulitzer Prize-winning critic and author are autistic.

Notable individuals known to have Asperger syndrome include Craig Nicholls, lead singer, songwriter, guitarist and only constant member of the Australian rock band The Vines, who was diagnosed in 2004, and actor Paddy Considine.
Swedish environmentalist Greta Thunberg, who in August 2018 started the "School strike for climate" movement, has explained how the "gift" of living with Asperger syndrome helps her "see things from outside the box" when it comes to climate change. In an interview with presenter Nick Robinson on BBC Radio 4's Today, the 16-year-old activist said that autism helps her see things in "black and white". She went on to say:

Additionally, media speculation of contemporary figures as being on the autism spectrum has become popular in recent times. New York magazine reported some examples, which included that Time magazine suggested that Bill Gates is autistic, and that a biographer of Warren Buffett wrote that his prodigious memory and "fascination with numbers" give him "a vaguely autistic aura". The magazine also reported that on Celebrity Rehab, Dr. Drew Pinsky, deemed basketball player Dennis Rodman a candidate for an Asperger's diagnosis, and the UCLA specialist consulted "seemed to concur". Nora Ephron criticized these conclusions, writing that popular speculative diagnoses suggest autism is "an epidemic, or else a wildly over-diagnosed thing that there used to be other words for." The practice of diagnosing autism in these cases is controversial.

See also
 Autism spectrum disorders in the media
 Autism: The Musical
 Autistic art
 Autistic culture
 Disability rights movement
 Discrimination against autistic people
 Human genetic diversity
 Ivar Lovaas
 Look Me in the Eye, a The New York Times bestseller
 "Mad pride"
 
 Social model of disability
 Societal and cultural aspects of autism
 TASH

References

Further reading
 
 
 Grandin, Temple. (2011). Thinking in Pictures, Expanded Edition: My Life with Autism. New York: Vintage. 
 Grandin, Temple. (1995). Sachs, Oliver (foreword).   Thinking in Pictures, and other stories from my life with autism. New York: Doubleday. 
 Loud Hands: Autistic People, Speaking. Washington, DC: Autistic Self Advocacy Network, 2012. Bascom, Julia. (Foreword).

External links

 John Elder Robison radio interview about life with Asperger's Syndrome